The General Union of Palestinian Women or (GUPW) is the official representative of Palestinian women within the Palestine Liberation Organization (PLO). It was established in 1965 as a body in the PLO  with the goal of creating an active role for women in the social, economic and political spheres of the Palestinian territories. The GUPW's executive committee consists of fifteen members including the president. The GUPW has organized exhibitions displaying Palestinian costumes, art and folklore and has established branches in 21 countries.

Notable people
May Sayegh – former secretary general in the 1980s
Salwa Abu Khadra – former secretary general

Intisar al-Wazir (Um Jihad) 
Intisar al-Wazir is the co-founder and President of the General Union of Palestinian Women. She is commonly referred to as the “mother of the fight” due to her ongoing passion for the cause which has provided newfound confidence in both Palestinian and non-Palestinian women as membership numbers continue to rise. Due to COVID-19, domestic-violence and economic needs have risen exponentially, al-Wazir’s leadership has been sighted through her calling upon the Prime Minister to provide protection through legislation.

References

External links

General Union of Palestinian Women
Collection of GUPW posters

Palestine Liberation Organization
Women's organizations based in the State of Palestine
Women in the State of Palestine